is a Japanese surname. Notable people with the surname include:

, Japanese painter
, Japanese microbiologist
, Japanese singer and musician
, Japanese filmmaker
, Japanese politician
, Japanese popular singer
, Japanese diplomat
, Japanese manga writer
, Japanese rhythmic gymnast
, Japanese athlete
, Japanese novelist
, Japanese actor and voice actor
, Japanese writer
Etsu Inagaki Sugimoto (1874-1950), Japanese-American autobiographer & writer
, Japanese female ultramarathon runner and world record-holder
, Japanese textile artist

Fictional characters
Mami Inagaki, a character from the Strike Witches franchise

See also
Inagaki, Aomori, a former village in Aomori Prefecture, Japan
5824 Inagaki, a main-belt asteroid

Japanese-language surnames